Ernest Victor Meyer (15 February 1865 – 28 June 1919) was a French show jumping champion. Meyer participated at the 1912 Summer Olympics held in Stockholm, where he earned a silver medal in team jumping with the French team.

References

External links

Olympic silver medalists for France
Equestrians at the 1912 Summer Olympics
Olympic equestrians of France
French male equestrians
Olympic medalists in equestrian
1865 births
1919 deaths
Medalists at the 1912 Summer Olympics